Jagnjilo is a village situated in Mladenovac municipality in Serbia.

References

Villages in Serbia
Mladenovac